Bayaut may refer to:

 Bayaut
 Bayaut, the Russian name for Boyovut, a town in Uzbekistan
 Boyovut District